Pek Nga is a traditional food in Kedah. It is also known as Lempeng Kelapa in Kelantan and Terengganu. Pek nga may be eaten with fish curry, coconut sticky rice, or dried fish. It is usually served during breakfast.

See also

 Cuisine of Malaysia
 Crêpe

References

External links
 PEKNGA MENU LARIS DI WARUNG KLASIK ALOR SETAR

Malay cuisine
Snack foods